Matola is a town and ward in Njombe district in the Iringa Region of the Tanzanian Southern Highlands. Its population according to the 2002 Tanzanian census is 14,106.

References

Wards of Njombe Region